Lučenec is a town in the Banská Bystrica Region of south-central Slovakia. Historically, it was part, and in the 18th century the capital, of Nógrád County of the Kingdom of Hungary. In 1920, as a result of the Treaty of Trianon, it became a part of Czechoslovakia. The town has a large synagogue, built in 1924, which served a large Jewish population before World War II. The synagogue underwent renovations in 2016.

Lučenec is the economic centre of the whole Novohrad region, which includes districts Poltár and Veľký Krtíš.

History
Lučenec and its surroundings were inhabited in the Stone Ages. Slavs moved to this area in the 6th and 7th century as the first permanent settlers and the Hungarians joined them in the 10th century.

The first indirect mention of Lučenec was in 1128, when Lambert built a chapel in honour of Virgin Mary. The first direct mention of the settlement was in 1247 under the name Luchunch, but until the first half of the 15th century it was only a village, and was located off the main trade routes. In 1442, Lučenec was conquered by the Hussites troops under command of John Jiskra of Brandýs and in 1451 the Battle of Lučenec took place near the village between the troops of John Hunyadi and those of Jiskra, where the latter emerged victorious.

After the fall of the Fiľakovo castle in 1554, Lučenec was under the control of the Ottomans and their vassals as part of Budin Eyalet until capturing by Austrians in 1593. It was regained by Ottomans in 1596 and was again part of Filek (Ottoman name for Fiľakovo) sanjak (its centre was in modern-day Rimavská Sobota) in Eğri Eyalet till 1686. The town was burned down many times until the first half of the 19th century, when during the Revolutions of 1848/1849 it was occupied by the Russian imperial troops.

The town underwent modernization in the 19th and 20th centuries, for example, new industries like brickworks or tanneries were built, telegraph line in 1865, and in 1871 it was connected to the railway connecting Budapest and Žilina. After World War I, Lučenec became part of Czechoslovakia, and, briefly in 1919, part of the Slovak Soviet Republic. In 1938, Lučenec was annexed to Hungary as a result of the First Vienna Award, and this lasted until 1945 when it was returned to Czechoslovakia.
Approximately 8.3% of current residents are ethnic Hungarians.

Climate
Lučenec has a Humid continental climate (Köppen: Dfa) with four alternating seasons. There are hot summers and cold winters. There is a high number of sunshine days with a short time of duration of snow cover as well as the cover is relatively low. Near by Lučenec are located several water reservoirs such as Ľadovo, Mýtna, Málinec and most popular Ružiná.

Demographics
From 25 902 inhabitants (census 2021) are
 Slovaks -         20 648        79,72%
 Hungarians -   2 171          8,38%
 others  -           7,721         11,9%

In 1910 out of 12,939 inhabitants 10,634 were Hungarians (82%), 1,675 Slovaks (13%), 428 Germans, 9 Romas, 1 Ruthenian, 12 Croatians, 18 Serbans and 162 others.

According to the 2001 census, there were 28,332 people living in the town, with majority of them being Slovaks (81.63%), with a minority of Hungarians (13.11%) and with a small percentage of Roma (2.32%), Czechs (0.61%) and others. 
The religious make-up was: 56.56% Roman Catholics, 21.12% people with no religious affiliation and 14.77% Lutherans.

Boroughs
Lučenec is divided into these boroughs:

 Lučenec
 Opatová
 Malá Ves
 Rúbanisko

Notable People

 József Kármán (1769–1795), sentimentalist Hungarian author.
 Sándor Petőfi (1823–1849), Hungarian poet and liberal revolutionary.
 Božena Slančíková (1867-1951), pen name Timrava, a Slovak novelist and playwright.
 Zoltán Speidl (1880–1917) Hungarian track and field athlete, competed at the 1900 Summer Olympics
 Zoltán Tildy (1889–1961), an influential leader of Hungary
 Tibor Serly (1901-1978), Hungarian classical composer
 Margit Bokor (1900-1949), Hungarian opera singer
 Ralph Henry Brewster, (1904-1951), American writer and musician, spent several days here in 1942.
 Pavol Szikora (1952–2021) a Slovak race walker. 
 Ivan Saktor (1954-2021)

Twin towns – sister cities

Lučenec is twinned with:

 Louny, Czech Republic
 Mělník, Czech Republic
 Pápa, Hungary
 Polesella, Italy
 Salgótarján, Hungary
 Zolotonosha, Ukraine

Gallery

See also
 List of cultural monuments in Lučenec

References

External links
 
 
 Spectacular Slovakia - Lučenec: reaching for the sky

Cities and towns in Slovakia
Bánffy family
Banská Bystrica Region